The Second Battle of El Alamein (23 October – 11 November 1942) was a battle of the Second World War that took place near the Egyptian railway halt of El Alamein. The First Battle of El Alamein and the Battle of Alam el Halfa had prevented the Axis from advancing further into Egypt.

The British victory was the beginning of the end of the Western Desert Campaign, eliminating the Axis threat to Egypt, the Suez Canal and the Middle Eastern and Persian oil fields. The battle revived the morale of the Allies, being the first big success against the Axis since Operation Crusader in late 1941. The end of the battle coincided with the Allied invasion of French North Africa in Operation Torch on 8 November, which opened a second front in North Africa.

High-Level Orders of Battle

Allies 
British Eighth Army 
Lieutenant-General Sir Bernard Law Montgomery
 Northern sector
 British XXX Corps (Lieutenant-General Oliver Leese)
 Australian 9th Division (Major-General Leslie Morshead)
 British 51st (Highland) Infantry Division (Major-General Douglas Wimberley)
 New Zealand 2nd Division (Lieutenant-General Bernard Freyberg)
 South African 1st Infantry Division (Major-General Dan Pienaar)
 Indian 4th Infantry Division (Major-General Francis Tuker)
 Southern sector
 British XIII Corps (Lieutenant-General Brian Horrocks)
 British 50th (Northumbrian) Infantry Division (Major-General John S. Nichols)
 British 44th (Home Counties) Infantry Division (Major-General Ivor T.P. Hughes)
 British 7th Armoured Division (Major-General John Harding)
 Reserve
 British X Corps (Lieutenant-General Herbert Lumsden)
 British 1st Armoured Division (Major-General Raymond Briggs)
 British 10th Armoured Division (Major-General Alexander Gatehouse)
 British 8th Armoured Division

Axis 
 Panzer Armee Afrika
 Generalfeldmarschall Erwin Rommel 
 90th Light Afrika Division (Generalmajor Ernst Strecker, later Theodor Graf von Sponeck)

 Deutsches Afrika Korps
 Generalleutnant Wilhelm Ritter von Thoma
 15th Panzer Division (Generalmajor Gustav von Vaerst)
 21st Panzer Division (Generalmajor Heinz von Randow)

 Italian XXI Army Corps
 Generale di Corpo d'Armata Enea Navarini; Generale di Divisione Alessandro Gloria
 25th Infantry Division "Bologna" (Generale di Divisione Alessandro Gloria)
 102nd Motorised Division "Trento" (Generale di Brigata Giorgio Masina)

 Italian XX Army Corps
 Generale di Divisione Giuseppe De Stefanis
 101st Motorised Division "Trieste" (Generale di Divisione Francesco La Ferla)
 132nd Armoured Division "Ariete" (Generale di Divisione Francesco Antonio Arena)
 133rd Armoured Division "Littorio" (Generale di Divisione Gervasio Bitossi)
 German 164th Light Africa Division (Generalleutnant Carl-Hans Lungershausen)

 Italian X Army Corps
 Generale di Divisione Federico Ferrari Orsi KIA 18 Oct
 Generale di Divisione Enrico Frattini thru 26 Oct
 Generale di Divisione Edoardo Nebbia from 27 Oct, POW 7 Nov
 17th Infantry Division "Pavia" (Generale di Divisione Nazzareno Scattaglia)
 27th Infantry Division "Brescia" (Generale di Divisione Brunetto Brunetti)
 185th Infantry Division "Folgore" (Generale di Divisione Enrico Frattini)
 Ramcke Parachute Brigade (Generalmajor Hermann-Bernhard Ramcke)

 Italian Army Africa 
 Marshal Ettore Bastico
 16th Motorised Division "Pistoia" (Generale di Divisione Giuseppe Falugi)
 136th Armoured Division "Giovani Fascisti" (Generale di Divisione Ismaele Di Nisio)

Allies 
British Eighth Army
Lieutenant-General Sir Bernard Law Montgomery

Under direct Army command
 1st Army Tank Brigade (Brigadier T.R. Price)
 42nd Royal Tank Regiment
 44th Royal Tank Regiment
 1st Armoured Brigade (reforming) (Brigadier G.N. Todd)
 4th Hussars (elements)
 8th (King's Royal Irish) Hussars (elements)
 2nd Royal Gloucestershire Hussars
 12th Anti-Aircraft Brigade (Brigadier Percy Calvert-Jones)
 14th (West Lothian, Royal Scots) Light Anti-Aircraft Regiment, Royal Artillery
 16th Light Anti-Aircraft Regiment, Royal Artillery
 27th Light Anti-Aircraft Regiment, Royal Artillery
 88th Heavy Anti-Aircraft Regiment, Royal Artillery
 94th Heavy Anti-Aircraft Regiment, Royal Artillery
 27th (London Electrical Engineers) Searchlight Regiment, Royal Artillery (two troops)
 2nd Anti-Aircraft Brigade (Brigadier Murray McIntyre)
 2nd Light Anti-Aircraft Regiment, Royal Artillery
 69th (Royal Warwickshire Regiment) Heavy Anti-Aircraft Regiment, Royal Artillery (199th and 261st batteries)
 21st Indian Infantry Brigade (reforming) (Brigadier J.J. Purves)
 1st Battalion, 6th Rajputana Rifles
 3rd Battalion, 7th Rajput Regiment
 2nd Battalion, 8th Gurkha Rifles
 9th Indian Field Company, Corps of Indian Engineers

Army troops
 B Squadron, 6th Royal Tank Regiment
 6th South African Armoured Car Regiment (one troop)
 566th Army Troops Company, Royal Engineers
 588th Army Troops Company, Royal Engineers
 25th Field Company, South African Engineers
 27th Field Company, South African Engineers
 31st Field Company, South African Engineers
 8th Army Signals, Royal Corps of Signals

British XXX Corps 

 XXX Corps occupied the northern sector of the Allied front.
 Lieutenant-General Oliver Leese
 Under direct Corps command
 XXX Corps Defence Squadron
 C Squadron, 4th/6th South African Armoured Car Regiment
 7th Medium Regiment, Royal Artillery
 64th Medium Regiment, Royal Artillery
 69th (Caernarvon & Denbigh Yeomanry) Medium Regiment, Royal Artillery
 66th Mortar Company, Royal Engineers (two sections detached to 9th Australian Division)
 11th Field Company, South African Engineers
 13th Field Company, South African Engineers
 22nd Field Park Company, South African Engineers
 XXX Corps Signals, Royal Corps of Signals

Divisions deployed north to south

  Australian 9th Division
 Major-General Leslie Morshead
 Division-level units
 9th Division Cavalry Regiment
 2/2nd Machine Gun Battalion 
 2/3rd Pioneer Battalion
 2/7th Field Regiment, Royal Australian Artillery
 2/8th Field Regiment, Royal Australian Artillery
 2/12th Field Regiment, Royal Australian Artillery
 3rd Anti-Tank Regiment, Royal Australian Artillery
 4th Light Anti-Aircraft Regiment, Royal Australian Artillery
 2/3rd Field Company, Royal Australian Engineers
 2/7th Field Company, Royal Australian Engineers
 2/13th Field Company, Royal Australian Engineers
 2/4th Field Park Company, Royal Australian Engineers
 9th Australian Division Signals
 Australian 24th Brigade (Brigadier Arthur H.L. Godfrey)
 2/28th Australian Infantry Battalion, Western Australia 
 2/32nd Australian Infantry Battalion, Victoria 
 2/43rd Australian Infantry Battalion, South Australia 
 Australian 26th Brigade (Brigadier David A. Whitehead)
 2/23rd Australian Infantry Battalion, Victoria
 2/24th Australian Infantry Battalion, Victoria
 2/48th Australian Infantry Battalion, SA
 Australian 20th Brigade (Brigadier Hugh Wrigley)
 2/13th Australian Infantry Battalion, New South Wales 
 2/15th Australian Infantry Battalion, Queensland 
 2/17th Australian Infantry Battalion, New South Wales

  British 51st (Highland) Infantry Division
 Major-General Douglas Wimberley
 Division-level units
 51st Battalion, Reconnaissance Regiment
 1/7th Battalion, Middlesex Regiment (machine gun battalion)
 50th Royal Tank Regiment (attached from 23rd Armoured Brigade)
 126th (Highland) Field Regiment, Royal Artillery
 127th (Highland) Field Regiment, Royal Artillery
 128th (Highland) Field Regiment, Royal Artillery
 61st (West Highland) Anti-Tank Regiment, Royal Artillery
 40th Light Anti-Aircraft Regiment, Royal Artillery
 51st (Highland) Divisional Engineers
 274th Field Company, Royal Engineers
 275th Field Company, Royal Engineers
 276th Field Company, Royal Engineers
 239th Field Park Company, Royal Engineers
 51st Highland Division Signals, Royal Corps of Signals
 British 152nd Infantry Brigade (Brigadier George Murray)
 2nd Battalion, Seaforth Highlanders
 5th Battalion, Seaforth Highlanders
 5th Battalion, Queen's Own Cameron Highlanders
 British 153rd Infantry Brigade (Brigadier Douglas Graham)
 5th Battalion, Black Watch
 1st Battalion, Gordon Highlanders
 5th/7th Battalion, Gordon Highlanders
 British 154th Infantry Brigade (Brigadier Henry W. Houldsworth)
 1st Battalion, Black Watch
 7th Battalion, Black Watch
 7th Battalion, Argyll and Sutherland Highlanders

  New Zealand 2nd Division
 Lieutenant-General Bernard Freyberg
 Division-level units
 2nd New Zealand Division Cavalry Regiment
 27th (Machine Gun) Battalion
 4th Field Regiment, New Zealand Artillery
 5th Field Regiment, New Zealand Artillery
 6th Field Regiment, New Zealand Artillery
 7th Anti-Tank Regiment, New Zealand Artillery
 14th Light Anti-Aircraft Regiment, New Zealand Artillery
 6th Field Company, New Zealand Engineers
 7th Field Company, New Zealand Engineers
 8th Field Company, New Zealand Engineers
 5th Field Park Company, New Zealand Engineers
 New Zealand 2nd Division Signals
 New Zealand 5th Infantry Brigade (Brigadier Howard Kippenberger)
 21st Battalion, New Zealand Infantry
 22nd Battalion, New Zealand Infantry
 23rd Battalion, New Zealand Infantry
 28th (Maori) Battalion, New Zealand Infantry

 New Zealand 6th Infantry Brigade (Brigadier William Gentry)
 24th Battalion, New Zealand Infantry
 25th Battalion, New Zealand Infantry
 26th Battalion, New Zealand Infantry
 British 9th Armoured Brigade (Brigadier John Currie)
 3rd (The King's Own) Hussars
 Royal Wiltshire Yeomanry
 Warwickshire Yeomanry
 14th Battalion, Sherwood Foresters

  South African 1st Infantry Division
 Major-General Dan Pienaar
 Division-level units
 8th Royal Tank Regiment
 South African 3rd Armoured Car Reconnaissance Regiment
 Regiment President Steyn (machine gun battalion)
 2nd Regiment Botha (in reserve until 31 October)
 1st Field Regiment, Cape Field Artillery, South African Artillery 
 4th Field Regiment, South African Artillery
 7th Field Regiment, South African Artillery
 1st Light Anti-Aircraft Regiment, South African Artillery
 1st Anti-Tank Regiment, South African Artillery
 1st Field Company, South African Engineers
 2nd Field Company, South African Engineers
 3rd Field Company, South African Engineers
 5th Field Company, South African Engineers
 19th Field Park Company, South African Engineers
 South African 1st Division Signals
 South African 1st Infantry Brigade (Brigadier E.P. Hartshorn)
 1st Duke of Edinburgh's Own Rifles
 1st Royal Natal Carabineers
 1st Transvaal Scottish
 South African 2nd Infantry Brigade (Brigadier Evered Poole)
 1st Cape Town Highlanders
 1st Natal Mounted Rifles
 1st/2nd Field Force Battalion
 South African 3rd Infantry Brigade 
 1st Imperial Light Horse
 1st Rand Light Infantry
 1st Royal Durban Light Infantry

  Indian 4th Infantry Division
 Major-General Francis Tuker
 Division-level Units
 Central India Horse (reconnaissance regiment)
 5th Battalion, 6th Rajputana Rifles (machine gun battalion)
 1st Field Regiment Royal Artillery
 11th Field Regiment, Royal Artillery
 32nd Field Regiment, Royal Artillery
 149th Anti-Tank Regiment, Royal Artillery
 57th Light Anti-Aircraft Regiment, Royal Artillery
 2nd Field Company, Bengal Sappers and Miners
 4th Field Company, Bengal Sappers and Miners
 12th Field Company, Madras Sappers and Miners
 11th Field Park Company, Madras Sappers and Miners
 4th Indian Division Signals
 Indian 5th Infantry Brigade (Brigadier Dudley Russell)
 1/4th Battalion, Essex Regiment 
 4th (Outram's) Battalion, 6th Rajputana Rifles 
 3rd (Queen Mary's Own) Battalion, 10th Baluch Regiment
 Indian 7th Infantry Brigade (Brigadier Arthur Holworthy)
 1st Battalion, Royal Sussex Regiment
 4th Battalion, 16th Punjab Regiment
 1st Battalion, 2nd King Edward's Own Gurkha Rifles
 Indian 161st Infantry Brigade (Brigadier Francis E.C. Hughes)
 1st Battalion, Argyll and Sutherland Highlanders
 1st Battalion, 1st Punjab Regiment
 4th Battalion, 7th Rajput Regiment

 Corps Reserve
 British 23rd Armoured Brigade (Brigadier George W. Richards)
 8th Royal Tank Regiment (detached to 1 SA Division)
 40th Royal Tank Regiment (detached to 9 Australian Division)
 46th Royal Tank Regiment
 50th Royal Tank Regiment (detached to 51st Highland Division)
 121st Field Regiment, Royal Artillery
 168th Battery, 56th Light Anti-Aircraft Regiment, Royal Artillery
 295th Army Field Company, Royal Engineers

British XIII Corps 

 
 XIII Corps occupied the southern sector of the Allied front.
 Lieutenant-General Brian Horrocks
 Under direct Corps command
 South African 4th/6th Armoured Car Regiment (one troop)
 XIII Corps Troops, Royal Engineers
 578th Army Field Company, Royal Engineers
 576th Corps Field Park Company, Royal Engineers
 XIII Corps Signals, Royal Corps of Signals

Divisions deployed north to south

  British 50th (Northumbrian) Infantry Division
 Major-General John S. Nichols
 Division-level units
 2nd Battalion, Cheshire Regiment (machine gun battalion)
 74th Field Regiment, Royal Artillery
 111th Field Regiment, Royal Artillery
 124th Field Regiment, Royal Artillery
 154th (Leicestershire Yeomanry) Field Regiment, Royal Artillery
 102nd (Northumberland Hussars) Anti-Tank Regiment, Royal Artillery
 34th Light Anti-Aircraft Regiment, Royal Artillery
 50th (Northumbrian) Divisional Engineers, Royal Engineers
 233rd Field Company, Royal Engineers
 505th Field Company, Royal Engineers
 235th Field Park Company, Royal Engineers
 50th Northumbrian Division Signals, Royal Corps of Signals
  Greek 1st Infantry Brigade (Colonel Pausanias Katsotas)
 1st Infantry Battalion
 2nd Infantry Battalion
 3rd Infantry Battalion
 1st Greek Field Artillery Regiment
 1st Greek Machine Gun Company
 1st Greek Field Company, Greek Engineers
 British 151st Infantry Brigade (Brigadier Joscelyn E.S. Percy)
 6th Battalion, Durham Light Infantry
 8th Battalion, Durham Light Infantry
 9th Battalion, Durham Light Infantry
 British 69th Infantry Brigade (Brigadier Edward C. Cooke-Collis)
 5th Battalion, East Yorkshire Regiment
 6th Battalion, Green Howards
 7th Battalion, Green Howards
  2nd Free French Brigade Group (under command)
 5th Battalion de Marche
 11th Battalion de Marche
 21st and 23rd North African Anti-Tank Companies
 2nd Company, Free French Engineers

  British 44th (Home Counties) Infantry Division
 Major-General Ivor T.P. Hughes
 Division-level units
 44th Reconnaissance Regiment (detached to 7th Armoured Division)
 6th Battalion, Cheshire Regiment (machine gun battalion)
 53rd Field Regiment, Royal Artillery
 57th (Home Counties) Field Regiment, Royal Artillery
 58th (Sussex) Field Regiment, Royal Artillery
 65th (8th London) Field Regiment, Royal Artillery
 57th (East Surrey) Anti-Tank Regiment, Royal Artillery
 30th Light Anti-Aircraft Regiment, Royal Artillery
 44th (Home Counties) Divisional Engineers

 11th Field Company, Royal Engineers
 209th (Sussex) Field Company, Royal Engineers
 210th (Sussex) Field Company, Royal Engineers
 211th (Sussex) Field Park Company, Royal Engineers
 577th Army Field Company, Royal Engineers (attached from XIII Corps Troops Royal Engineers)
 44th (Home Counties) Divisional Signals, Royal Corps of Signals
 British 131st Infantry Brigade (Brigadier William Donovan Stamer)
 1/5th Battalion, Queen's Royal Regiment (West Surrey)
 1/6th Battalion, Queen's Royal Regiment (West Surrey)
 1/7th Battalion, Queen's Royal Regiment (West Surrey)
 British 132nd Infantry Brigade (Brigadier Lashmer Whistler)
 2nd Battalion, Buffs (Royal East Kent Regiment)
 4th Battalion, Queen's Own Royal West Kent Regiment
 5th Battalion, Queen's Own Royal West Kent Regiment
 British 133rd (Lorried) Infantry Brigade (Detached to 10th Armoured Division)

  British 7th Armoured Division
 Major-General John Harding
 Division-level units
 1st Household Cavalry Regiment
 11th Hussars (under command from 4th Armoured Brigade, in reserve])
 2nd Derbyshire Yeomanry (under command from 8th Armoured Division)
 44th Reconnaissance Regiment (under command from 44th Infantry Division)
 3rd Regiment, Royal Horse Artillery
 4th Field Regiment, Royal Artillery
 97th (Kent Yeomanry) Field Regiment, Royal Artillery
 65th (Norfolk Yeomanry) Anti-Tank Regiment, Royal Artillery
 15th (Isle of Man) Light Anti-Aircraft Regiment, Royal Artillery
 7th Armoured Divisional Engineers
 4th Field Squadron, Royal Engineers
 21st Field Squadron, Royal Engineers
 143rd Field Park Squadron, Royal Engineers
 7th Armoured Division Signals, Royal Corps of Signals
 British 4th Light Armoured Brigade (Brigadier Marcus G. Roddick)
 Royal Scots Greys
 4th/8th Hussars
 1st Battalion, King's Royal Rifle Corps
 British 22nd Armoured Brigade (Brigadier George "Pip" Roberts)
 1st Royal Tank Regiment
 5th Royal Tank Regiment
 4th County of London Yeomanry (Sharpshooters)
 1st Battalion, Rifle Brigade
  1st Free French Brigade Group (under command) (Brigadier Marie Pierre Koenig)
 1st Battalion, Foreign Legion
 2nd Battalion, Foreign Legion
 3rd Battalion, Pacific Marine Infantry
 3rd Field Regiment, Royal Artillery (attached)
 1st Free French Artillery Regiment
 2nd Anti-Aircraft Company, 1st Marine Fusiliers
 2nd Free French Anti-Tank Company
 22nd North African Anti-Tank Company
 1st Field Company, Free French Engineers
  With (under command)
 1st Free French Flying Column
 Armoured Car Squadron and Portee troop, 1st Morocco Spahis
 1st Free French Tank Company
 Anti-Aircraft troop, 1st Battalion, French Foreign Legion

British X Corps 

 X Corps supplied reserve divisions behind the main Allied line.
 Lieutenant-General Herbert Lumsden
 Under direct Corps command
 X Corps Troops, Royal Engineers 
 571st Army Field Company (attached to 10th Armoured Division) 
 572nd Army Field Company (attached to 1st Armoured Division) 
 573rd Army Field Company (attached to 10th Armoured Division) 
 570th Corps Field Park Company
 X Corps Signals, Royal Corps of Signals

Divisions deployed north to south

  British 1st Armoured Division
 Major-General Raymond Briggs
 Division-level units
 12th Royal Lancers
 2nd Regiment, Royal Horse Artillery
 4th Regiment, Royal Horse Artillery
 11th Regiment, Royal Horse Artillery (Honourable Artillery Company) (ex-8th Armoured Division)
 76th (Royal Welch Fusiliers) Anti-Tank Regiment, Royal Artillery
 42nd Light Anti-Aircraft Regiment, Royal Artillery
 1st Armoured Divisional Engineers
 1st Field Squadron, Royal Engineers
 9th Field Squadron, Royal Engineers (from 8th Armoured Division)
 1st Armoured Division Signals, Royal Corps of Signals
 British 2nd Armoured Brigade (Brigadier Arthur Fisher)
 2nd Dragoon Guards (Queen's Bays)
 9th Queen's Royal Lancers
 10th Royal Hussars
 Yorkshire Dragoons (Motor battalion)
 X Company, 1st Battalion, Royal Northumberland Fusiliers (machine gun battalion)
 British 7th Motor Brigade (Brigadier Thomas Bosvile)
 2nd Battalion, Kings Royal Rifle Corps
 2nd Battalion, Rifle Brigade
 7th Battalion, Rifle Brigade
 Hammerforce (attached from 8th Armoured Division)
 4th/6th South African Armoured Car Regiment
 146th (Pembroke & Cardiganshire) Field Regiment, Royal Artillery
 73rd Anti-Tank Regiment, Royal Artillery
 56th Light Anti-Aircraft Regiment, Royal Artillery
 Z Company, 1st Battalion, Royal Northumberland Fusiliers (machine gun company)
 7th Field Squadron, Royal Engineers
 9th Field Squadron, Royal Engineers
 Minefield Task Force (under Commanding Officer, 2nd Bn Rifle Brigade)
 2nd Dragoon Guards (Queen's Bays) (one troop)
 9th Queen's Royal Lancers (one troop)
 10th Royal Hussars (one troop)
 7th Field Squadron, Royal Engineers
 9th Field Squadron, Royal Engineers (from 8th Armoured Division)
 572nd Army Field Company (from X Corps Troops Royal Engineers) 
 2nd Battalion, Rifle Brigade (less Support Company)

  British 10th Armoured Division
 Major-General Alexander Gatehouse
 Division-level units
 Royal Dragoons
 1st Regiment, Royal Horse Artillery
 5th Regiment, Royal Horse Artillery (attached from 8th Armoured Division)
 104th (Essex Yeomanry) Regiment, Royal Horse Artillery (attached from 8th Armoured Division)
 98th (Surrey & Sussex Yeomanry Queen Mary’s) Field Regiment, Royal Artillery
 84th Anti-Tank Regiment, Royal Artillery
 53rd (King's Own Yorkshire Light Infantry) Light Anti-Aircraft Regiment, Royal Artillery
 10th Armoured Divisional Engineers
 2nd Field Squadron, Royal Engineers
 3rd Field Squadron, Royal Engineers (attached to Minefield Task Force)
 6th Field Squadron, Royal Engineers (attached from 8th Armoured Division)
 141st Field Park Squadron, Royal Engineers
 10th Armoured Division Signals, Royal Corps of Signals
 British 8th Armoured Brigade (Brig. Edward C.N. Custance)
 3rd Royal Tank Regiment
 Sherwood Rangers Yeomanry
 Staffordshire Yeomanry
 1st Battalion, Buffs (Royal East Kent Regiment)
 British 24th Armoured Brigade (Brigadier Arthur G. Kenchington) (Attached from 8th Armoured Division)
 41st Royal Tank Regiment
 45th Royal Tank Regiment
 47th Royal Tank Regiment
 11th Battalion, Kings Royal Rifle Corps
 British 133rd Infantry Brigade (Brigadier Alec W. Lee)
 2nd Battalion, Royal Sussex Regiment
 4th Battalion, Royal Sussex Regiment
 5th Battalion, Royal Sussex Regiment
 W Company, 1st Battalion, Royal Northumberland Fusiliers (machine gun company) (attached from 8th Armoured Division)
 Minefield Task Force (Lt.-Col. G.R. McMeekan, Commanding Royal Engineer, 10th Armoured Division) (attached to 133rd Bde for mine clearance)
 3rd Field Squadron, Royal Engineers
 571st Army Field Company (from X Corps Troops Royal Engineers)
 573rd Army Field Company (from X Corps Troops Royal Engineers)
 141 Field Park Squadron (detachment)

  British 8th Armoured Division
 Major-General Charles Gairdner
 6th Field Squadron, Royal Engineers (detached to 10th Armoured Division)
 9th Field Squadron, Royal Engineers (detached to 1st Armoured Division)
 145th Field Park Squadron, Royal Engineers
 8th Armoured Division Signals, Royal Corps of Signals

Axis 

Divisions deployed north to south

Panzer Armee Afrika 
 

Generalfeldmarschall  Erwin Rommel 

  German 90th Light Afrika Division
 Generalmajor  Ernst Strecker, later Theodor Graf von Sponeck
 155th Panzergrenadier Regiment (with 707th Heavy Infantry Gun Company)
 200th Panzergrenadier Regiment (with 708th Heavy Infantry Gun Company)
 346th Panzergrenadier Regiment
 190th Artillery Regiment
 190th Anti-tank Battalion
 Under command
 Force 288
 605th Anti-tank Battalion
 109th Anti-aircraft Battalion
 606th Anti-aircraft Battalion

Deutsches Afrika Korps 
 

Generalleutnant  Wilhelm Ritter von Thoma

  German 15th Panzer Division
 Generalmajor  Gustav von Vaerst
 8th Panzer Regiment
 115th Panzergrenadier Regiment
 33rd Artillery Regiment
 33rd Anti-tank Battalion
 33rd Engineer Battalion

  German 21st Panzer Division
 Generalmajor  Heinz von Randow
 5th Panzer Regiment
 104th Panzergrenadier Regiment
 155th Artillery Regiment
 39th Anti-tank Battalion
 200th Engineer Battalion

Italian XXI Army Corps 

 
Generale di Corpo d'Armata Enea Navarini
Generale di Divisione Alessandro Gloria (Thru 26 October)
 Corps-level troops
 7th Bersaglieri Regiment
 X Bersaglieri Battalion
 XI Bersaglieri Battalion
 8th Army Corps Artillery Grouping
 XXXIII Heavy Artillery Group (149/40 guns)
 LII Heavy Artillery Group (152/37 guns)
 CXXXI Heavy Artillery Group (149/28 howitzers)
 XXVII Construction Engineers Battalion
 LXV Signal Engineers Battalion
 14th Fortification Engineer Company

  102nd Motorised Division "Trento"
 Generale di Brigata Giorgio Masina
 61st Infantry Regiment "Trento" (3x battalions)
 62nd Infantry Regiment "Trento" (3x battalions)
 46th Motorised Artillery Regiment "Trento"
 I Group (100/17 howitzers)
 II Group (100/17 howitzers)
 III Group (75/27 field guns)
 IV Group (75/27 and 75/13 field guns)
 412th Anti-aircraft Battery (20/65 Mod. 35 anti-aircraft guns)
 414th Anti-aircraft Battery (20/65 Mod. 35 anti-aircraft guns)
 LXIII Anti-aircraft Group (75/50 anti-aircraft guns)
 CCCLIV Frontier Guard Artillery Group (77/28 field guns)
 CCCLV Frontier Guard Artillery Group (75/27 field guns)
 CXXXI Heavy Artillery Group (149/28 howitzers)
 IV Anti-tank Battalion "Granatieri di Sardegna" (47/32 anti-tank guns)
 LI Mixed Motorised Engineer Battalion

  25th Infantry Division "Bologna"
 Generale di Divisione Alessandro Gloria
 39th Infantry Regiment "Bologna" (3x battalions)
 40th Infantry Regiment "Bologna" (2x battalions)
 205th Artillery Regiment "Bologna"
 I Group (100/17 howitzers)
 II Group (100/17 howitzers)
 III Group (75/27 field guns)
 IV Group (75/27 field guns)
 4th Anti-aircraft Battery (20/65 Mod. 35 anti-aircraft guns)
 437th Anti-aircraft Battery (20/65 Mod. 35 anti-aircraft guns)
 CCCLVII Frontier Guard Artillery Group (77/28 field guns)
 XXV Mixed Engineer Battalion

Italian XX Army Corps 

Generale di Divisione Giuseppe De Stefanis
 Corps-level troops
 XVIII Anti-aircraft and Anti-tank Group (8.8cm Flak and 20/65 guns)
 LXII Anti-aircraft Group (75/50 anti-aircraft guns)
 XXIV Mixed Engineer Battalion
 2nd Bersaglieri Motorcyclists Company
 106th Field Hospital
 576th Field Hospital

Northern Sector

  101st Motorised Division "Trieste"
 Generale di Divisione Francesco La Ferla
 65th Infantry Regiment "Trieste" (2x battalions)
 66th Infantry Regiment "Trieste" (2x battalions)
 21st Motorised Artillery Regiment "Trieste"
 I Group (100/17 howitzers)
 II Group (100/17 howitzers)
 III Group (75/27 field guns)
 IV Group (75/27 field guns)
 5th Battery / XLII Anti-aircraft Group (75/50 anti-aircraft guns)
 VIII Armoured Bersaglieri Battalion (AB 41 armoured cars)
 XI Tank Battalion "M" (M13/40 and M14/41 tanks)
 XXXII Mixed Motorised Engineer Battalion

  German 164th Light Africa Division
 Generalleutnant  Carl-Hans Lungershausen
 125th Infantry Regiment
 382nd Infantry Regiment
 433rd Infantry Regiment
 220th Artillery Regiment
 220th Engineer Battalion
 220th Cyclist Unit
 609th Anti-aircraft Battalion

  133rd Armoured Division "Littorio"
 Generale di Divisione Gervasio Bitossi
 133rd Tank Infantry Regiment (M13/40 and M14/41 tanks)
 IV Tank Battalion "M"
 XII Tank Battalion "M"
 LI Tank Battalion "M"
 12th Bersaglieri Regiment
 XXI Bersaglieri Anti-tank Battalion (47/32 anti-tank guns)
 XXIII Bersaglieri Battalion
 XXXVI Bersaglieri Battalion
 3rd Fast Artillery Regiment
 II Group (75/27 field guns)
 III Group (105/28 howitzers)
 5th Anti-aircraft Battery (20/65 Mod. 35 anti-aircraft guns)
 406th Anti-aircraft Battery (20/65 Mod. 35 anti-aircraft guns)
 DLIV Self-propelled Artillery Group (Semovente 75/18)
 DLVI Self-propelled Artillery Group (Semovente 75/18)
 CCCXXXII Frontier Guard Artillery Group (100/17 howitzers)
 XXIX Anti-aircraft and Anti-tank Group (8.8cm Flak)
 III Armoured Squadrons Group "Lancieri di Novara" (Fiat L6/40 light tanks)
 CXXXIII Mixed Engineer Battalion

Southern Sector

  132nd Armoured Division "Ariete"
 Generale di Divisione Francesco Antonio Arena
 132nd Tank Infantry Regiment (M13/40 and M14/41 tanks)
 IX Tank Battalion "M"
 X Tank Battalion "M"
 XIII Tank Battalion "M"
 8th Bersaglieri Regiment
 III Bersaglieri Anti-tank Battalion (47/32 anti-tank guns)
 V Bersaglieri Battalion
 XII Bersaglieri Battalion
 132nd Armoured Artillery Regiment
 I Group (75/27 field guns)
 II Group (75/27 field guns)
 III Group (105/28 howitzers)
 V (DLI) Self-propelled Artillery Group (Semovente 75/18 self-propelled guns)
 VI (DLII) Self-propelled Artillery Group (Semovente 75/18 self-propelled guns)
 XV Heavy Field Artillery Group (105/28 howitzers)
 XXXI Anti-aircraft and Anti-tank Group (8.8cm Flak anti-aircraft guns)
 DI Anti-aircraft and Anti-tank Group (90/53 and 20/65 Mod. 35 anti-aircraft guns)
 III Armored Squadrons Group "Nizza Cavalleria" (AB 41 Armoured cars)
 CXXXII Mixed Engineer Battalion

Italian X Army Corps 

Generale di Divisione Federico Ferrari Orsi (KIA 18 October)
Generale di Divisione Enrico Frattini (thru 26 October)
Generale di Divisione Edoardo Nebbia (from 27 October, POW 7 November)
 Corps-level troops
 9th Bersaglieri Regiment
 XXVIII Bersaglieri Battalion
 LVII Bersaglieri Battalion
 16th Army Corps Artillery Grouping
 XLIX Artillery Group (105/28 howitzers)
 CXLVII Heavy Artillery Group (149/28 howitzers)
 X Construction Engineers Battalion
 X Signal Engineers Battalion
 XXXI Sappers Battalion
 65th Field Hospital
 91st Field Hospital

  27th Infantry Division "Brescia"
 Generale di Divisione Brunetto Brunetti
 19th Infantry Regiment "Brescia" (2x battalions)
 20th Infantry Regiment "Brescia" (3x battalions)
 1st Fast Artillery Regiment
 I Group (100/17 howitzers)
 III Group (75/27 field guns)
 IV Group (75/27 field guns)
 V Group (8.8cm Flak and 20/65 Mod. 35 anti-aircraft guns)
 401st Anti-aircraft Battery (20/65 Mod. 35 anti-aircraft guns)
 404th Anti-aircraft Battery (20/65 Mod. 35 anti-aircraft guns)
 XXVII Mixed Engineer Battalion

  Ramcke Parachute Brigade
 Generalmajor  Hermann-Bernhard Ramcke
 1st Battalion, 2nd Paratroopers Regiment
 1st Battalion, 3rd Paratroopers Regiment
 2nd Battalion, 5th Paratroopers Regiment
 Lehrbattailion Burkhardt
 Paratroopers Anti-tank Battalion
 Paratroopers Artillery Battery

  185th Infantry Division "Folgore"
 Generale di Divisione Enrico Frattini
 186th Infantry Regiment "Folgore"
 V Paratroopers Battalion
 VI Paratroopers Battalion
 VII Paratroopers Battalion
 Paratroopers Support Weapons Company (47/32 anti-tank guns)
 187th Infantry Regiment "Folgore"
 II Paratroopers Battalion
 IV Paratroopers Battalion
 IX Paratroopers Battalion
 Paratroopers Support Weapons Company (47/32 anti-tank guns)
 185th Artillery Regiment "Folgore"
 I Paratroopers Artillery Group (3x batteries with 47/32 anti-tank guns)
 III Paratroopers Artillery Group (3x batteries with 47/32 anti-tank guns)
 7th Paratroopers Artillery Battery (47/32 anti-tank guns)
 146th Anti-aircraft Battery (20/65 Mod. 35 anti-aircraft guns)
 411th Anti-aircraft Battery (20/65 Mod. 35 anti-aircraft guns)
 Ammunition and Supply Unit
 VIII Paratroopers Sapper Battalion

  17th Infantry Division "Pavia"
 Generale di Divisione Nazzareno Scattaglia
 27th Infantry Regiment "Pavia" (2x battalions)
 28th Infantry Regiment "Pavia" (2x battalions)
 26th Artillery Regiment "Pavia"
 II Group (100/17 howitzers)
 III Group (75/27 field guns)
 IV Group (75/27 field guns)
 77th Anti-aircraft Battery (20/65 Mod. 35 anti-aircraft guns)
 432nd Anti-aircraft Battery (20/65 Mod. 35 anti-aircraft guns)
 XVII Mixed Engineer Battalion

Italian Army Africa 

The commander of the Italian Army Africa Marshal Ettore Bastico had no tactical control over Italian formations at El Alamein. All Italian units there were assigned to Rommel's Panzer Armee Afrika. The only two units under Bastico's command were the 16th Motorised Division Pistoia, which had just arrived from Italy and was not yet ready for frontline duty, and the 136th Armoured Division "Giovani Fascisti", which was garrisoning the Siwa Oasis.

  16th Motorised Division "Pistoia"
 Generale di Divisione Giuseppe Falugi
 35th Infantry Regiment "Pistoia"
 36th Infantry Regiment "Pistoia"
 3rd Motorised Artillery Regiment
 XVI Mortar Battalion
 LI Mixed Engineer Battalion
 16th Anti-tank Company

  136th Armoured Division "Giovani Fascisti"
 Generale di Divisione Ismaele Di Nisio
 Infantry Regiment "Giovani Fascisti" (2x battalions)
 IX Autonomous Infantry Battalion
 136th Artillery Regiment
 XIV Motorized Artillery Group (65/17 field guns mounted on Morris CS8)
 XV Motorized Artillery Group (65/17 field guns mounted on Morris CS8)
 XVI Motorized Artillery Group (75/27 field guns mounted on TL.37)
 XVII Motorized Artillery Group (100/17 howitzers mounted on Lancia 3Ro trucks)
 88th Anti-aircraft Battery (20/65 Mod. 35 anti-aircraft guns)
 III Armoured Squadrons Group "Cavalleggeri del Monferrato" (AB 41 Armoured cars)

Notes

References

Sources

Print

Web 
 
 
 
 

Egypt in World War II
Battles of World War II involving the United Kingdom
Battles and operations of World War II involving India
History of the Bengal Sappers
Battles of World War II involving Italy
Battles of World War II involving Australia
Battles and operations of World War II involving Greece
Battles of World War II involving France
Tank battles of World War II
Western Desert campaign
World War II orders of battle
1942 in Egypt
Battles of World War II involving Germany
Battles of World War II involving New Zealand